Robert Troy Kimball (born March 29, 1947) is an American singer and songwriter best known as the original and longtime frontman of the rock band Toto from 1977 to 1984 and again from 1998 to 2008. Kimball has also performed as a solo artist and session singer.

History

Early life
Kimball was born in Orange, Texas but raised in nearby Vinton, Louisiana. (Vinton did not have a hospital.) He started singing as a child, dabbling on vocals and playing piano and acoustic guitar in a musical household throughout his youth - mostly covering and performing 1950s and 1960s R&B hits, 1800s Traditional Olde Tyme music; as well as rare local Swamp pop and Cajun folk songs, typical of Louisiana. 

His parents were extremely supportive of his hobby of performing music and his musical talents; and devoted much interest in his opportunity to become a professional musician as full-time career by adulthood. He is of English, Cajun French, Welsh and Jewish ancestry. He graduated from McNeese State University in Lake Charles, Louisiana in 1969. 

Throughout the 1970s, Kimball performed as the vocalist in various New Orleans-area bands, including The Levee Band, which became Louisiana's LeRoux after Kimball left.

Career success
In 1974, Kimball moved from Louisiana to Los Angeles, California to pursue a full-time music career. In California, he joined three members of Three Dog Night, Floyd Sneed, Joe Schermie, and Michael Allsup to form a band called S.S. Fools. They released one album on CBS Records, which was considered a commercial failure, causing the band to be dropped from their label and to split up within a year and a half. In 1976, David Paich and Jeff Porcaro asked Kimball to join them with three other session musicians, who would eventually form Toto. He submitted a self-penned audition song for the band: "You Are the Flower", which he had written for his daughter and was later included on Toto's debut album. Paich and Porcaro were impressed by Kimball's bluesy vocal style and offered him the job of vocalist and songwriter. The pair liked Kimball's ability to sing in an R&B style and to fuse it with hard rock and jazz, which was characteristic and attributed to his Louisiana origins.

Kimball performed on the first four studio albums by Toto. He was asked to leave the band in 1984 during the sessions for the Isolation album. In the late 1990s, on good terms with his former bandmates, Kimball was asked to rejoin Toto, which he accepted.

A longstanding urban legend holds that the band named itself 'Toto' after Kimball's "real" name, "Robert Toteaux." This story was an in-joke perpetuated by Toto's original bassist, David Hungate - due to Kimball's home-state of Louisiana and his Cajun heritage. According to Toto guitarist Steve Lukather, the real reason for this choice of band name was that Toto was "Just a really simple (unpretentious) name: easy to remember and easily identifiable, in any language."

After Toto
After splitting from Toto in 1984, Bobby Kimball relocated to Germany for a solo career under producer Frank Farian of the Far Corporation.

Kimball also continued to work as a session artist, singing background vocals with a trio composed of Michael McDonald from The Doobie Brothers and Bill Champlin of Chicago. Kimball was nearly asked by the band to return to Toto during 1989–1990 to record songs for the band's greatest hits album, Past to Present 1977–1990, only to be replaced by singer Jean-Michel Byron (a decision said to have derived from Sony, the band's record company at the time). Byron was let go shortly thereafter, and guitarist-vocalist Steve Lukather took over Toto's primary lead vocal duties from 1991 to 1999. After leaving the band, Kimball released the live album Classic Toto Hits in late 1990, in which he performed various Toto songs from over the years. He recorded the album with the Frankfurt Rock Orchestra. In 1994, Kimball released his first solo album Rise Up, featuring the single "Woodstock".

Return to Toto
In 1998, Kimball rejoined Toto. The band then returned to the studio to record Mindfields. Toto toured in support of the album throughout 1999 and 2000. In late 1999, the band released the live album Livefields. In 1999, Kimball released his second solo album All I Ever Needed, with the single "Kristine". In 2002, Toto released a covers album Through the Looking Glass. 

In February 2006, Toto released Falling in Between, their first studio album of new material since 1999; however, it was announced in June 2008 that the band members had gone separate ways. When the group reformed in 2010, Kimball was not asked to return and was replaced by previous Toto vocalist Joseph Williams.

Kimball hosts his own website where he offers vocal advice to aspiring singers.

Kimball was involved in the Pink Floyd tribute album, Pigs and Pyramids, An All Star Lineup Performing the Songs of Pink Floyd, released in 2002. His contribution "Have a Cigar" also appeared on another Pink Floyd tribute album that year, Pink Box: Songs of Pink Floyd.

Latest activities

Kimball provided additional backing vocals on the song, "Caroline," on the 2006 Chicago album, XXX.

In January 2010, he did fourteen concerts in Germany on the "Rock Meets Classic" Tour with the Bohemian Symphony Orchestra Prague, featuring Philipp Maier as Conductor and Music Arranger. The singers with Kimball on this tour were Lou Gramm, the original lead vocalist of Foreigner, and Dan McCafferty, from the band Nazareth.

On May 16, 2010, at the LMHOF Louisiana Music Homecoming in Erwinville, Louisiana, Bobby Kimball was inducted into The Louisiana Music Hall of Fame.

Kimball recorded a progressive rock album in 2010 entitled Elements under the band name Yoso with former Yes members Tony Kaye and Billy Sherwood. Kimball recorded the 2011 album Kimball/Jamison with Jimi Jamison.

In July 2011, Kimball toured Ireland with an emerging Irish band, Shadowplay. The tour visited Dublin, Galway, Limerick and Sligo, concluding in a headline performance at The Buncrana Music Festival, Ireland's largest not-for-profit music event.

In November 2012, Kimball toured South America. The tour included Argentina, Uruguay, Chile and Peru. In March 2013, Kimball was a special guest vocalist with the Raiding the Rock Vault classic rock tribute show in Las Vegas, Nevada.

In May 2014, in Genoa, at the FIM - Fiera Internazionale della Musica, Kimball obtained from the director of the event Verdiano Vera, the FIM Award 2014 - Legend of Rock - Best Voice. In February 2015, he represented the United States at the LVI International Song Festival in Viña del Mar, Chile, with the song "Living Your Life for Happiness".

In late 2016, Bobby released a solo album, We're Not In Kansas Anymore, and the same year, music website No Echo featured Kimball on their "Best Male AOR Singers" list. 

In November 2019, German media reported that Kimball suffers from dementia. This was also confirmed by Steve Lukather in an interview with Eonmusic in 2021.

Discography

Solo albums
 Rise Up (1994)
 All I Ever Needed (1999)
 We're Not In Kansas Anymore (2016)

Live albums
 Classic Toto Hits with The Frankfurt Rock Orchestra (1990)

Compilation albums
 Tribute to Ray Charles with The hr Bigband (1993)
 Mysterious Sessions (2017)

with S. S. Fools
 S. S. Fools (1976)

with Toto
 Toto (1978)
 Hydra (1979)
 Turn Back (1981)
 Toto IV (1982)
 Mindfields (1999)
 Through the Looking Glass (2002)
 Falling in Between (2006)

with Far Corporation
 Division One (1985)
 Solitude (1994)

with West Coast All Stars
 California Dreamin'  (1997)
 Naturally (1998)

with Yoso
 Elements (2010)

with Jimi Jamison
 Kimball Jamison (2011)

Guest appearances
 Backing vocals on "Still Of The Night" (with Quiet Riot on the album, QR III) (1986)
 "What It Takes" (from the compilation album, Tribute to Aerosmith: Let the Tribute Do the Talkin''') (2001)
 "The Seventh Son (with Chris Catena's Rock City Tribe on the album, Truth in Unity'') (2020)

References

External links

Official website

1947 births
Living people
People from Vinton, Louisiana
American rock singers
American pop rock singers
American rock keyboardists
American tenors
American soft rock musicians
American male singers
Yoso members
Toto (band) members
American expatriates in Germany
World Classic Rockers members